Alan Conway (1934 – 5 December 1998) was an English conman, best known for impersonating film director Stanley Kubrick. Conway and his wife were travel agents with offices in Harrow and Muswell Hill.

Early years
Alan Conway was born Eddie Alan Jablowsky in Whitechapel London in 1934. At the age of 13 he was sent to a borstal for theft. Around that time, he began frequently changing his name and fabricating various personal histories: among other stories, he told people he was a Polish Jew who had been imprisoned in a Nazi concentration camp.

During the 1980s, Conway left his wife for a male lover, who later died of AIDS. Conway's business soon collapsed and he descended into alcoholism.

Kubrick impersonation
Conway's impersonations of director Stanley Kubrick occurred during the early 1990s, by which time Kubrick had been withdrawn from public view for about 15 years. Kubrick had also worn a full beard since the late 1960s, whereas Conway was clean-shaven, thus allowing his impersonation to appear more legitimate. 

He convinced several figures in the entertainment industry that he was the famed director, promising them both roles in films and exclusive interviews, and occasionally conned others into paying for meals and drinks, claiming his studio would reimburse them.

Frank Rich, a theatre critic for The New York Times, was taken in by Conway's act in Joe Allen's restaurant when he invited Conway and his friends to join him at his table. In fact, Rich was so convinced by Conway that he later said that he believed Stanley Kubrick was homosexual after meeting Conway. Rich and his journalist friends were excited at the prospect of an exclusive interview with "Stanley Kubrick", only later discovering that he was an impostor after contacting executives at Warner Brothers, who were aware of the scam but had been unable to identify the imposter.

Kubrick's lawyer was apprised of the scam and, when he informed Kubrick of the impostor, Kubrick was said to be highly amused by the idea. Kubrick's wife, Christiane, was less impressed with it. As she later reflected: "It was an absolute nightmare. This strange doppelgänger who was pretending to be Stanley. Can you imagine the horror?"

Conway was tracked down in part through the efforts of Kubrick's personal assistant, Anthony Frewin, who went on to write the screenplay for the film Colour Me Kubrick (2005) based on these incidents, with John Malkovich starring as Conway.

Conway died in December 1998 of a heart attack, three months before Kubrick died (also from a heart attack) in March 1999.

See also
David Hampton, a con-artist with a similar modus operandi

References

External links 
 

1934 births
1998 deaths
20th-century English criminals
Impostors
Confidence tricksters
People from Whitechapel
British Jews
Gay men
English criminals
20th-century English LGBT people